Guldfaxe is a glacier of the King Frederick VI Coast area in the Sermersooq municipality, southeastern Greenland.

This glacier is named after Gullfaxi, the golden-maned horse of Norse mythology.

Geography 
Guldfaxe is a large, active glacier flowing from the eastern side of the Greenland ice sheet.

The Guldfaxe glacier flows roughly eastward between sharp nunataks and flows into the right side of the Rimfaxe Glacier shortly before its terminus in the Sehested Fjord.

See also 
 List of glaciers in Greenland
 Skinfaxe (glacier)

References

External links 
 Vulnerability of Southeast Greenland Glaciers to Warm Atlantic Water From Operation IceBridge and Ocean Melting Greenland Data
 Guldfaxe Glacier, NASA
 Rimfaxe and Guldfaxe Glaciers – NASA, Operation IceBridge
 Figure S21. Aerial images recorded in the latter half of World War II
Glaciers of Greenland
Sermersooq